Holzhäuser Heckethaler is a literary prize of Hesse.

Literary awards of Hesse